Janusz Akermann (born 1957 in Tczew) is a Polish painter and Professor of Fine Arts in Gdańsk.

Between 1981 and 1985, Akerman studied at the Painting Department at the State Academy of Fine Arts in Gdańsk. He graduated in 1985, taking over from Kazimierz Śramkiewicz. Then between 1999 and 2002, he started teaching painting and drawing at the European Academy of Art in Warsaw. It was not until 2006 that Akerman received the title of Professor.

External links
Biography

1957 births
Living people
20th-century Polish painters
20th-century Polish male artists
21st-century Polish painters
21st-century Polish male artists
People from Tczew
Polish male painters
Academic staff of the Academy of Fine Arts in Gdańsk